The discography of Dutch singer-songwriter Anouk consists of twelve studio albums, four live albums, one compilation album, one extended play (EP), twenty-eight singles as a solo artist, two singles as a featured artist, five promotional singles and five video albums.

Anouk's debut single, "Mood Indigo", was released in 1996 and became a moderate hit in her native Netherlands. Its follow-up, "Nobody's Wife", was released the following year. After peaking at number two on the Dutch Top 40, the single became a European hit, entering the top ten in Sweden, Norway, Denmark and Finland. 
Both singles were included in her first studio album. Titled Together Alone, it topped the Dutch Albums Chart and also achieved commercial success across Europe.

With her second album, Urban Solitude, Anouk failed to repeat her international success, but consolidated her career in the Netherlands and in Flanders. As of today, she has achieved eight number-one albums in her country, including the compilation Lost Tracks, featuring B-sides and alternate versions of her previous hits, and the live album Live at Gelredome, released in 2008.

Albums

Studio albums

Compilation albums

Live albums

Extended plays

Singles

As featured artist

Promotional singles

Video albums
2001 - Lost Tracks [DVD+CD]
2002 - The Music Videos
2004 - Close-up
2006 - Anouk Is Alive (April 28, 2006)
2008 - Live at Gelredome

Notes

A  "Mood Indigo" did not enter the Dutch Top 40, but peaked at number six on the Dutch Tipparade chart, which acts as a 30-song extension to the Top 40.
B  "Don't" did not enter the Ultratop 50, but peaked at number thirteen on the Flemish Ultratip, which acts as an extension to the Ultratop 50.
C  "Love" did not enter the Dutch Top 40, but peaked at number two on the Dutch Tipparade chart, which acts as a 30-song extension to the Top 40.
D  "Everything" did not enter the Ultratop 50, but peaked at number thirteen on the Flemish Ultratip, which acts as an extension to the Ultratop 50.
E  "I Live for You" did not enter the Dutch Top 40, but peaked at number four on the Dutch Tipparade chart, which acts as a 30-song extension to the Top 40.
F  "I Don't Wanna Hurt" did not enter the Ultratop 50, but peaked at number one on the Flemish Ultratip, which acts as an extension to the Ultratop 50.
G  "Lovedrunk" did not enter the Dutch Top 40, but peaked at number three on the Dutch Tipparade chart, which acts as a 30-song extension to the Top 40.
H  "Down & Dirty" did not enter the Ultratop 50, but peaked at number twenty on the Flemish Ultratip, which acts as an extension to the Ultratop 50.
I  "Save Me" did not enter the Ultratop 50, but peaked at number fifteen on the Flemish Ultratip, which acts as an extension to the Ultratop 50.
J  "What Have You Done" did not enter the Ultratop 50, but peaked at number seventeen on the Flemish Ultratip, which acts as an extension to the Ultratop 50.
K  "Downhill" did not enter the Ultratop 50, but peaked at number eleven on the Flemish Ultratip, which acts as an extension to the Ultratop 50.
L  "Today" did not enter the Dutch Top 40, but peaked at number ten on the Dutch Tipparade, which acts as a 30-song extension to the Top 40.

References

External links
Anouk Official Website
Anouk Chronicles

Discographies of Dutch artists
Pop music discographies